Henry Harding Bingley (1887–1972) was an English painter in washed oils and watercolour.

Life

Bingley was born in London but spent many years of his life in Perranporth, Cornwall working as an artist. During his working life he was an Associated Member of the British Watercolour Society (BWS), a member of the Royal Miniature Society (RMS) and a member of the Society of Miniaturists (SM).

Paintings

There is evidence of an extensive catalogue of his work. His paintings almost always include water and he is best known for watercolours of Cornish coastal scenes. However, there are pictures in existence that portray Devon, Wales, Scotland, Cumbria, Yorkshire, Dorset and London. He signed his paintings as H.H. Bingley in the earlier years as script and later in uppercase.

Misnomer

Bingley's given name was once incorrectly thought to be Herbert. This was quashed after further research.

References

External links
H H Bingley (Official website)

19th-century English painters
English male painters
English watercolourists
Landscape artists
1887 births
1972 deaths
20th-century English painters
20th-century English male artists
19th-century English male artists